Carseland is a hamlet in Alberta, Canada within Wheatland County.

It is within Census Division No. 5.

History 

The advent of the cattlemen in the late 1800s to the Bow River country west of the Blackfoot Indian Reserve brought men like: Major General Thomas Bland Strange (1881), Charlie Hawks, Colonel Arthur Goldfinch, Felix McHugh (1886) and Colonel Arthur Wyndham (1887) to the Carseland area.

When the Military Colonization Company, which Strange had founded ceased to exist, the Canadian Pacific Railway (CPR) permitted free grazing on their  on the north side of the Bow and it attracted many new settlers to the area.

The Addemans, Moffats and McGregors purchased the Horsetrack from the Goldfinchs and started the Horsetrack Cattle Company in 1901. Others such as Groves, Moorhouse, Brown, McHughes, McKinnon and Newbolts soon followed.

When the open range came to an end most of the areas cattlemen became the first grain farmers of the district.

In 1903, the CPR brought irrigation to its large land acquisitions in the Carseland area.

As the land prospered and more product was being shipped by rail to market, the CPR began construction of the Gleichen/Shepard cut-off in 1913.  These rails carried troops to the First World War in 1914.

Due to its proximity to the river crossing and railway, Carseland grew rapidly into a prosperous community during the 1920s through 1940s. It boasted six grain elevators, a railway station, school, general store, barber shop and pool-room, post office, restaurant, garage and Ford car dealer, well house, lumber yard, hardware store, meat market, bank, stock yards, two churches, hotel and community centre. Only three original buildings still standing on Railway Avenue are the hotel, the post office was formerly the Carseland Meat Market owned by the Bonitz family (and is now in the one strip mall) and the former hardware store - all of which were built in 1916.

Demographics 

Economy 
Carseland's main employers include Nutrien, Orica and Stella-Jones.

See also 
List of communities in Alberta
List of designated places in Alberta
List of hamlets in Alberta

References 

Hamlets in Alberta
Calgary Region
Wheatland County, Alberta
Designated places in Alberta